"Pavarësia" University of Vlorë is a university in Vlorë, Albania, that was established in 2009.

The university was created in 2009 by decision No. 279 (dated 12-03-2009) of the Council of Ministers of Albania and acts according to the law No 9741 (date 21-5-2007 – and its later changes) given by the Ministry of Education and Science.

It has two faculties:
 The College of Economy and Social Sciences, offering  Bachelor Degree, Master of Professional Studies and Master of Science courses in economy, law and political sciences.
 The College of Applied Sciences: Bachelor Degree, Master of Professional Studies and Master of Science courses in computer engineering and Master of Science (integrated degree) courses in architecture.

The governing body of "Pavarësia" University is the Board of co-partners, which is chaired and represented by its president, Ardian Zykaj. The university's rector is Dr. Lavdosh Ahmetaj.

According to the order of the Ministry of Education and Science (No 290, date 09-07-2012), the Bachelor programs of the institution are officially accredited by the ministry.

According to the order of the Ministry of Education and Science (No 388, date 10-08-2011), the institution received the permission to start new courses:
 Master Professional
 Specialist of the Law for Commercial Societies
 Specialist of the Law for Bank System
 Specialist of the Law for Public Administration
 Finance and Bank
 Finance and the Accounting firms
 Applying Informatics Systems in Public Administration
 System and Network Administration
 Software Systems Programming Specialist
 Master of Sciences
 Private Law and International Private Law
 Public Law and International Public Law
 Public Finance and Public Administration
 European Studies
 Diplomacy and International Politics
 Informatics Engineering
 Economic Informatics

See also
 List of universities in Albania

References

Universities in Albania
Buildings and structures in Vlorë
Educational institutions established in 2009
2009 establishments in Albania